The Ukrayinska Besida Theatre (until 1914: Ruska Besida Theater) – was the first Ukrainian professional theater in operation from 1864 to 1924. Its first performance took place in the premises of The Ukrainian National Home (Народний Дім) building in Lviv. The theater was subsidized by the Ruska Besida Society in Lviv and occasionally supported by the Galician Diet.

Beginnings
  
"Руська бесіда" was a society, which arranged literary, musical and dance evenings, concerts, balls and lectures.  One of its tasks became the organization of a theater.  In 1861, Yuliian Lavrivsky (Юліан Григорович Лаврівський) wrote in a newspaper article: "If we want our language to thrive… we must see that it will be more involved in public use and…we think that the best help here could be to establish a theater in Lviv,…the theater will enlighten us of our history, will define the past, and will help us to love this great land, by stirring up admiration for our poetry and art."   
  
In January 1864, the director of the newly created theater became Omelian Bachynsky (Омелян Васильович Бачинський) who had been director of a theatre in Zhytomyr.  On March 29, 1864, in The Ukrainian National Home (Народний Дім) in Lviv, the opening of the first Ukrainian professional theater took place.   It premiered with the play "Marusya" (Маруся) based on the novel by Kvitka-Osnovianenko (Григорія Квітки-Основ'яненка).

Growth  
Kostya Levytsky (Кость Левицький) wrote: "Actors of rank and students hurried to join the theatre, to devote themselves to the development of their native drama."  There was great excitement, for the then-Rusyns realized that their language, which was pushed aside publicly, would lead to a revival of the spirit of the people.  The theater sent troupes beyond Lviv, to tour Kolomyia,  Stanyslaviv, and Chernivtsi.  At the end of 1864 the company toured through Sambir and Przemyśl.  Their repertoire was replenished with new pieces, and translations.   Some actors of the theater also performed on the Polish stage, and this exchange of stage experiences caused the artistic level of the domestic repertoire on the Galician scene to rise.

Golden Age
For the director Teofila Romanovych (Теофіла Федорівна Романович), the theater was driven by a good acting structure and the increase of the repertoire. She prepared the ground for Ivan Biberovych (Іван Біберович  ) and Ivan Hrynevetsky (Іван Миколайович Гриневецький), whose period of directorship was called the "Golden Age of the Galician theater". They introduced Ukrainian historical drama by Pavel Barvinsky (Павло Якович Барвінський), household drama by Mykhailo Starytsky, and bourgeois drama by Grigory Tseglinsky (Григорій Іванович Цеглинський); operas by Mykola Lysenko and Semen Hulak-Artemovsky; and added the Western European dramas of Friedrich Schiller, Eugène Scribe, Heinrich von Kleist,  Carlo Goldoni, as well as operettas by Jacques Offenbach and Johann Strauss II.

The Theater in 1908
 

After a certain decline, the theater again rose with the directorship of Joseph Stadnik (Йосип Дмитрович Стадник), mainly due to the spread of Western European opera repertoire and European drama. The Theater put on vaudeville, melodrama, operetta, translated pieces of Western European playwrights, and performed their own Ukrainian dramatists. 

German writers Hermann Sudermann, Gotthold Ephraim Lessing, Gerhart Hauptmann; Scandinavian writers Henrik Ibsen, August Strindberg; French writers Edmond Rostand, Pierre Beaumarchais, Molière; English writers Oscar Wilde, George Bernard Shaw, and William Shakespeare (translated by Ivan Franko) could be seen on their stage. The writings of Nikolai Gogol were performed, as well as of the Russian writers Leo Tolstoy and Anton Chekhov; the work of Polish playwrights  Aleksander Fredro and Stanisław Przybyszewski also graced their stage. 

Besides the Ukrainian operas of Mykola Lysenko and Mykola Arkas, Ukrainians were introduced for the first time to such operas as: La Juive by Fromental Halévy,  Madama Butterfly by Giacomo Puccini, Carmen by Georges Bizet, La traviata by Giuseppe Verdi, Faust by Charles Gounod, The Tales of Hoffmann by Jacques Offenbach, Cavalleria rusticana by Pietro Mascagni, The Bartered Bride by Bedřich Smetana, Halka by Stanisław Moniuszko, and others.

Awakening of National Consciousness
The theater became part of an awakening of a national consciousness for Ukrainians and acquired not only a lasting place in the history of the Galician rebirth, but also greatly contributed to the rise of the modern Ukrainian theater in Central and Eastern Ukraine.

Theater directors 

In July 1924, because of the lack of funds, the theater ceased to exist.

Notable alumni 
 Amvrosy Buchma (1891 – 1957), Ukrainian actor and director
 Ivan Franko, (1856 –1916), Ukrainian poet, writer, social and literary critic, journalist, translator
 Marko Kropyvnytskyi, (1840 – 1910), Ukrainian writer, dramaturge, composer, theatre actor and director
 Les Kurbas, (1887–1937), considered by many to be the most important Ukrainian theater director of the 20th century
 Irena Turkevycz-Martynec, (1899 – 1983), a Prima donna in the Lviv Theatre of Opera and Ballet
 Mykola Voronyi, (1871 –1938), Ukrainian writer, poet, actor, director, and political activist
 Alexander Zagarov, (1877 – 1941), Russian and Ukrainian, Soviet actor and theatre director, better known under his stage name Zagarov (Загаров)

References

Notes

External links 
ONTAKT TV: Tania Stech, Eye on Culture, Les Kurbas; Лесь Курбас

Bibliography
 Чарнецький С. Нарис історії українського театру в Галичині. Львів, 1934.
 Лужницький Г. З історії українського театру. — Київ, ч. 2 — 4 і 2. Філадельфія 1953. — С. 54.
 Лужницький Г. Зах.-євр. репертуар в українському театрі.
 Львівський театр товариства «Українська Бесіда». 1915—1924 / О. О. Боньковська; Наук. т-во ім. Шевченка в Америці, НАН України. Ін-т народознав., Ін-т мистецтвознав., фольклористики та етнології ім. М. Т. Рильського. — Л. : Літопис, 2003. — 340 c. — (Мистец. театру). — Бібліогр.: с. 310—325.
 Альманах «Гомону України» на 1959. — Торонто, 1958.
 Проскуряков В., Ямаш Ю. Архітектура українських театрів. Простір і дія. — Друге видання, виправлене і доповнене. — Львів: Видавництво Львівської політехніки; Видавництво «Срібне слово», 2004. — 584 с.

Theatres in Lviv
Theatre in Ukraine
History of Lviv
Theatres completed in 1864
 
1864 establishments in Ukraine